The More-with-Less Cookbook is a cookbook commissioned by Mennonite Central Committee in 1976 with the goal of "helping Christians respond in a caring-sharing way in a world with limited food resources" and "to challenge North Americans to consume less so others could eat enough". The first edition of the book has received forty-seven printings, with over 847,000 copies sold worldwide, including Bantam Press, British English and German editions.

The book advocates the consumption of more whole grains, legumes, fruits, vegetables, nuts and seeds, the moderation of meat and dairy products and the avoidance of processed and convenience foods. The recipes, collected from Mennonite and other Christian families around the world, are intended to be affordable, nutritious and socially and ecologically responsible.

A new 40th anniversary edition of the book was published in 2016

See also 

Simple living
Mennonite cuisine

References

External links 

 Martin, Pat Hostetter. "Longacre, Doris Janzen (1940-1979)." Global Anabaptist Mennonite Encyclopedia Online. 1987. Retrieved November 11, 2009

1976 non-fiction books
2000 non-fiction books
Cookbooks
Mennonite cuisine